Christopher "Kit" Colin Cummins (born February 28, 1966) is an American chemist, currently the Henry Dreyfus Professor at the Massachusetts Institute of Technology.  He has made contributions to the coordination chemistry of transition metal nitrides, phosphides, and carbides.

Early life and education
Cummins was born in Boston, Massachusetts, on February 28, 1966. He attended Middlebury College and Stanford University before transferring to Cornell University where he performed undergraduate research under the direction of Peter T. Wolczanski. At Cornell, Cummins conducted research on the reactivity of low-coordinate zirconium and titanium complexes bearing bulky silanamide ligands (tBu3SiNH−), with small molecules such as methane, benzene, and carbon monoxide. 

After graduating from Cornell with an AB degree in 1989, Cummins went to the Massachusetts Institute of Technology to obtain his PhD in chemistry in 1993 under the direction of Richard R. Schrock. Cummins conducted doctoral research on the synthesis of low-coordinate transition metal complexes bearing trialkylsilated variants of the tris(2-aminoethyl)amine ligand. In collaboration with Robert E. Cohen, he also discovered a new technique for synthesizing nanoclusters of metal sulfide semiconductors within block copolymer microdomains.

Independent career 
After receiving his PhD in 1993, Cummins was invited to stay at MIT as an assistant professor and was later promoted to full professor in 1996. Cummins became the Henry Dreyfus Professor in Chemistry in 2015.

Research 
In one contribution, Cummins and coworkers described routes to simple phosphorus compounds including a low temperature route to diphosphorus:

Honors and awards
In 2007, Cummins was awarded the 2007 Raymond and Beverly Sackler Prize in the Physical Sciences by Tel Aviv University and the 2007 F. Albert Cotton Award by the American Chemical Society.

In 2008, Cummins was elected a fellow of the American Academy of Arts & Sciences.

In 2013, Cummins was awarded the Ludwig Mond Award by the Royal Society of Chemistry.

In 2017, Cummins was elected as a member of the National Academy of Sciences. In the same year, the American Chemical Society awarded Cummins the 2017 Linus Pauling Medal in recognition of his synthetic and mechanistic studies of early-transition metal complexes.

References

Living people
Massachusetts Institute of Technology School of Science faculty
21st-century American chemists
Cornell University alumni
Massachusetts Institute of Technology School of Science alumni
1966 births